The Museum of Communication is co-located with the Nuremberg Transport Museum in Nuremberg, Germany. It shows various ways in which people communicate with each other.

Exhibition 
The exhibition's four rooms address the subject of communication – sounds, images, texts, or internet. Exhibits include the first German telephone, postal delivery vehicles and various communication equipment.

The collection includes over 400 objects. Interactive stations invite visitors to become a part of the exhibition. Participants can attend a writing workshop, send a message via the pneumatic post, or play the role of television presenter.

One of the exhibition's key design elements is matching the architecture to the themes covered in the respective room.

References

External links 

Official Website of the Museum
Social Media Newsroom of the Museum
Youtube Video Channel of the Museum
Description of the Museum on the Official Website of the Nuremberg Tourism Agency

Museums in Nuremberg
Nuremberg